Francisco Pons y Boigues (1861-1899) was a Spanish Arabist and historian.

Life
Francisco Pons Boigues was born into humble circumstances in 1861 in the Valencian town of Carcaixent. He gained an early education at the seminar in Valencia.  Following an opportune meeting with the Arabist Francisco Codera y Zaidín (editor of the series Bibliotheca arabico-hispana) he became his pupil. Codera encouraged him to study at the Faculty of Arts in Madrid.  There his teacher was Marcelino Menéndez Pelayo.  He graduated in 1885.  Among his published texts were Apuntes de un viaje por Argelia y Túnez  ('Notes of a trip through Algeria and Tunisia') (1888),  Notes on the Mozarabic writings of Toledo that are preserved in the National Historical Archive (Madrid, 1897), Essay Biobibliography on Arabic-Spanish historians and geographers (Madrid, 1898),  Two important works of Ibn Hazm) and  Hayy ibn Yaqdhan of Ibn Tufail (Zaragoza, 1900, with a preface by Marcelino Menéndez Pelayo), among others. He died in 1899.

References

Bibliography

External links 
Francisco Pons Boigues in the AECID Digital Library

19th-century Spanish historians
19th-century male writers
Spanish Arabists
Arabic–Spanish translators
1861 births
Date of birth missing
1899 deaths
Date of death missing
Place of death missing
People from Valencia
19th-century translators